James Christopher Carmack (born December 22, 1980) is an American actor, singer, and former fashion model. He is known for his roles in three popular television shows—the teen drama series The O.C. (2003–2004) as Luke Ward, the country music drama Nashville as Will Lexington (2012–2018), and the medical drama Grey's Anatomy (2018–present) as Dr. Atticus Lincoln.

Carmack has also appeared in films, including The Butterfly Effect 3: Revelations, Into the Blue 2: The Reef, Love Wrecked, Beauty & the Briefcase and Alpha and Omega.

Early life and education
Carmack was born in Washington, D.C., and grew up in Derwood, Maryland. He has a brother and a sister. As a young boy, he enjoyed participating in all types of sports: baseball, basketball, football, and wrestling. Carmack was also a longtime counselor at Seneca Creek Day Camp, known  for singing the original "Rocko the Lazy Moth" and "Ode to Salpino" among other favorites. At Magruder High School, however; his attentions turned to theater and he began working on three productions per year, on-stage and off, in addition to competing in numerous drama festivals.

Career
After graduation, Carmack attended New York University to pursue an arts degree at the Tisch School. He left NYU after he was discovered by John Yannella, a modeling scout, and decided to have a go at the profession. His looks were exactly what Bruce Weber was seeking for Abercrombie & Fitch. The other catalogs and editorials that he has worked for include: Lord and Taylor, Macy's, Target, Who.A.U, Elle France, Nautica, Guess?, and Cosmogirl.

After two years in New York City, Carmack decided to move to Los Angeles and immerse himself in acting. He is best known by global audiences as Luke on the first season of The O.C., but did not continue because producers could not guarantee him airtime in the upcoming year. In 2005, Carmack became a model for Ezra Fitch, a limited upscale label sold at Abercrombie & Fitch.

In 2006, Carmack starred in the film Lovewrecked with Amanda Bynes and Jonathan Bennett and decided to hone his acting skills in the theaters of New York and London.

From March 16 to May 21, 2006 Carmack starred in the Off-Broadway production of Entertaining Mr. Sloane at the Laura Pels Theatre. The play, directed by Scott Ellis, also featured Tony Award nominees Alec Baldwin and Jan Maxwell.

In 2006 Carmack made his London stage debut in a rare revival of Tennessee Williams' Summer and Smoke, a play that hadn't been performed in London for 55 years. Carmack starred opposite Rosamund Pike and was directed by former Royal Shakespeare Company artistic director Adrian Noble. It played the Apollo Theatre from October 21 – November 25, 2006, failing to complete its scheduled run.

Carmack portrayed Susan Delfino's cousin Tim in the television show Desperate Housewives for one episode.

Carmack portrayed Sam Reide, the main character of the film The Butterfly Effect 3: Revelations, the third film in The Butterfly Effect film franchise, released in theaters in January 2009. He also made his first voice role in Alpha and Omega, which was released in theaters in September 17, 2010, and reprised his role as Garth in Alpha and Omega 2: A Howl-iday Adventure, being one of the few actors from the original to appear in at least one sequel.

In 2013, Carmack was cast in the ABC drama series Nashville as Scarlett and Gunnar's neighbor Will, a sexy and charming country singer and guitar player. Carmack's character initially appeared to be a womanizer and a potential threat to Scarlett and Gunnar's relationship, but it was revealed that the character is gay, and trying to protect his image as a heterosexual country music heartthrob. Carmack appeared in the final six episodes of the season, and was promoted from a recurring role to a series regular for season 2.

In 2018, Carmack was cast as Dr. Atticus "Link" Lincoln on the ABC hit medical drama Grey's Anatomy.

In 2019, Carmack made his Hollywood Bowl debut playing the role of Rapunzel's Prince in the show Into the Woods.

Personal life
Carmack announced his engagement to Erin Slaver on March 2, 2016. They married on October 20, 2018. Their first daughter was born in August 2016, and a second daughter was born in May 2022.

Filmography

Theater credits

Discography

EPs
Pieces of You (2015)
Nashville, Season 6: Episode 1 (2018)
 Contributed 1 track: "Don't Come Easy" 
Nashville, Season  6: Episode 2 (2018)
 Contributed 2 tracks: "Stop the World (And Let Me Off)" with Sam Palladio and Jonathan Jackson and "Right Where You Want Me" with Sam Palladio
Nashville, Season 6: Episode 4 (2018)
 Contributed 2 tracks: "Tearin Up My Heart" with Sam Palladio and Jonathan Jackson and "My Arms" with Sam Palladio and Jonathan Jackson
Nashville, Season  6: Episode 5 (2018)
 Contributed 2 tracks: "Go With It" with Sam Palladio, Jonathan Jackson, and Rainee Blake and "Hold On (Not Leaving You Behind)" with Sam Palladio, Jonathan Jackson, and Rainee Blake
Nashville, Season  6: Episode 6 (2018)
 Contributed 1 track: "Love is Loud" with Sam Palladio, Jonathan Jackson, and Rainee Blake 
Nashville, Season  6: Episode 7 (2018)
 Contributed 1 track: "Smoking the Boys" with Sam Palladio, Jonathan Jackson, and Rainee Blake 
Nashville, Season  6: Episode 8 (2018)
 Contributed 1 track: "Hard Days" with Sam Palladio, Jonathan Jackson, and Rainee Blake
Nashville, Season  6: Episode 9 (2018)
 Contributed 1 track: "My Turn" 
Nashville, Season  6: Episode 10 (2018)
 Contributed 1 track: "Go" with Sam Palladio, Jonathan Jackson, and Rainee Blake
Nashville, Season  6: Episode 16 (2018)
 Contributed 1 track: "A Life That's Good" with Sam Palladio, Rainee Blake, and Jonathan Jackson, and "A Life That's Good" with Hayden Panettiere, Connie Britton, Charles Esten, Sam Palladio, Clare Bowen, Jonathan Jackson, Lennon Stella, Maisy Stella, and Ronny Cox

Soundtrack
The Music of Nashville: Season 1, Volume 2 (2013)
 Contributed 1 track: "You Ain't Dolly (And You Ain't Porter)" with Clare Bowen
The Music of Nashville: Season 2, Volume 1 (2013)
 Contributed 2 tracks: "What If I Was Willing" and "Can't Say No To You" with Hayden Panettiere 
The Music of Nashville: Season 2, Volume 2 (2014)
 Contributed 4 tracks: "It's On Tonight" with Will Chase and Charles Esten, "Is That Who I Am", "Hurtin' On You" and "Then I Was Loved By You"
Nashville: On the Record (2014)
 Contributed 2 tracks: "It's On Tonight" with Will Chase and Charles Esten and "A Life That's Good" with the Nashville cast
The Music of Nashville: Season 3, Volume 1 (2014)
 Contributed 2 tracks: "If It's Love" and "If Your Heart Can Handle It" with Aubrey Peeples
Nashville: On the Record Volume 2 (2015)
 Contributed 3 tracks: "If I Drink This Beer" with Will Chase, "If Your Heart Can Handle It" with Aubrey Peeples and "Friend of Mine" with the Nashville cast 
The Music of Nashville: Season 3, Volume 2 (2015)
 Contributed 2 tracks: "I'm On It" and "Broken Song"
The Music of Nashville: Season 4, Volume 1 (2015)
 Contributed 2 tracks: "Sleep Tonight (A Lullaby)" with Jonathan Jackson and "Run With Me"
Nashville: On the Record Volume 3 (2016)
 Contributed 2 tracks: "Being Alone" and "And Then We're Gone" with the Nashville cast
The Music of Nashville: Season 4, Volume 2 (2016)
 Contributed 2 tracks: "Moving On Never Felt So Good" and "Ain't it Beautiful"
The Music of Nashville: Season 5, Volume 1 (2017)
 Contributed 1 track: "Burn to Dark"
The Music of Nashville: Season 5, Volume 2 (2017)
 Contributed 1 track: "By Your Side"
The Music of Nashville: Season 5, Volume 3 (2017)
 Contributed 2 tracks: "Stand Up" and "Little Darlin'" with Clare Bowen
The Music of Nashville: Season 6, Volume 1 (2018)
 Contributed 2 tracks: "Hold On (Not Leaving You Behind)" with Sam Palladio, Rainee Blake, and Jonathan Jackson and "Love is Loud" with Sam Palladio, Rainee Blake, and Chris Carmack
The Music of Nashville: Season 6, Volume 2 (2018)
 Contributed 3 tracks: "My Turn", "Go" with Sam Palladio, Rainee Blake, and Jonathan Jackson, and "A Life That's Good" with Hayden Panettiere, Connie Britton, Charles Esten, Sam Palladio, Clare Bowen, Jonathan Jackson, Lennon Stella, Maisy Stella, and Ronny Cox

Singles

Tours
Nashville in Concert (2014)

References

External links

 
 

1980 births
20th-century American male actors
21st-century American male actors
21st-century American singers
Male actors from Maryland
American country singer-songwriters
American male film actors
American male television actors
Living people
Tisch School of the Arts alumni
People from Derwood, Maryland
Male actors from Washington, D.C.
American male stage actors
Male models from Maryland
Country musicians from Maryland
Country musicians from Washington (state)
Singer-songwriters from Maryland
Singer-songwriters from Washington (state)